Selatan is the Malay and Indonesian word for south and can be found in topography. 
E.g. 
 Sulawesi Selatan -> South Sulawesi
 Sumatera Selatan -> South Sumatra
South Cape (Indonesia)
 Lebuhraya Utara-Selatan -> North–South Expressway (Malaysia)

Indonesian words and phrases
Malay words and phrases